Lukáš Zelenka (born 5 October 1979) is a retired professional footballer, midfield player and national team player of the Czech Republic.

Career
At the age of 17 he moved from Sparta Prague to Belgium. He played for Anderlecht and Westerlo. In summer 2001 Sparta bought him back and then he became one of the most important players of their squad. In November 2004 he scored against Manchester United at Old Trafford for Sparta in the Champions League after confidently striding into the box and slotting home after a slick passing move to draw a goal back for Sparta making it 2–1. It was to no avail however as United went on to complete a 4-1 victory. In 2006, he moved to Vestel Manisaspor in Turkey. On 21 September 2009 the Czech attacking midfielder has been released by K.V.C. Westerlo.

International career
Zelenka made his debut for the Czech Republic national team in the qualifying match against Macedonia on 8 June 2005. Czech Republic won 6-1. He has had three international appearances for the Czech Republic.

Honours

Club
Westerlo
Belgian Cup: 2000-01

Sparta Prague
Czech First League: 2002–03
Czech Cup: 2003–04

International
Czech Republic Under-21
UEFA European Under-21 Championship: 2002

References

External links
 
 Official Sparta Prague website
 

1979 births
Living people
Footballers from Prague
Association football midfielders
Czech footballers
Czech Republic youth international footballers
Czech Republic under-21 international footballers
Czech Republic international footballers
Czech First League players
AC Sparta Prague players
Belgian Pro League players
R.S.C. Anderlecht players
K.V.C. Westerlo players
Manisaspor footballers
Süper Lig players
1. FC Slovácko players
Nemzeti Bajnokság I players
Budapest Honvéd FC players
Czech expatriate footballers
Expatriate footballers in Belgium
Expatriate footballers in Turkey
Expatriate footballers in Hungary
Czech expatriate sportspeople in Belgium
Czech expatriate sportspeople in Turkey
Czech expatriate sportspeople in Hungary
1. SK Prostějov players